"Press It Up" is the second single off reggae artist Sean Paul's album, Imperial Blaze. The track was premiered on 11 July 2009 on his official website.

Music video 
The video premiered on 9 September 2009. It was directed by Jessy Terrero.

Charts

References

External links

2009 singles
Sean Paul songs
Music videos directed by Jessy Terrero
Songs written by Sean Paul
2009 songs
Reggae fusion songs